Pall Mall (or adopted ) is a British brand of cigarettes produced by British American Tobacco.

History 

The Pall Mall brand was introduced in 1899 by the Black Butler Company (UK) in an attempt to cater to the upper class with the first "premium" cigarette. It is named after Pall Mall, a well-known street in the St James's area of London, containing several of the private clubs which such people patronized.

In 1907, Pall Mall was acquired by the American Tobacco Company with the sale of Butler & Butler. The new owners used the premium brand to test innovations in cigarette design, such as, in 1939, the "king-size" (now the standard size for cigarettes at 85 mm, although today that includes the filter length), and a new way of stuffing tobacco that supposedly made cigarettes easier on the throat.

Pall Mall reached the height of its popularity in 1960 when it was the number one brand of cigarette in America. Capitalising on their popularity, the company introduced "longs", 100 mm long cigarettes in 1966. It was edged out in 1966 by Winston cigarettes, when Pall Mall found that it could no longer compete with the advertising campaign "Winston tastes good like a cigarette should." In the 1940s, Pall Mall had its own grammatically incorrect slogan which touted it as the cigarette which "travels the smoke further", referencing the longer 85 mm length. Their slogan during the '50s and early '60s was "OUTSTANDING...and they are MILD!"

In 1994, Pall Mall and Lucky Strike were purchased by Brown & Williamson Tobacco Corporation as the former American Tobacco company shed its tobacco brands. In 2001 Pall Mall was re-branded as a savings brand, and introduced several varieties of filtered cigarettes. Brown & Williamson merged with R. J. Reynolds Tobacco Company on July 30, 2004, with the surviving company taking the name of the latter. Reynolds continues to make unfiltered and filtered styles of Pall Mall for the U.S. market, emphasizing the latter. British American Tobacco makes and sells Pall Mall outside the U.S.

Pall Mall currently is in the "Growth Brand" segment of the R. J. Reynolds brand portfolio. Within British American Tobacco, Pall Mall is one of their four drive brands. During the Great Recession, Pall Mall was marketed as a "premium product at a sub-premium price", which pushed the product from a 1.95 percent market share with a 1.6 billion quarterly volume in 2006 to 7.95 percent and 5.5 billion in third quarter 2010. This compares with former top-seller Camel, which has not performed as well over the period, with 8 percent share and 5.6 billion.

Pall Mall is now Reynolds' most popular cigarette, along with Newport and Camel. In October 2012, Reynolds debuted two new versions of its menthol cigarette, Pall Mall Black, described as "full flavor", and Pall Mall White, called "smoother". The traditional menthol style is called Pall Mall Green.

In the United States, Pall Mall is currently offered primarily in 6 colors, the existing color scheme represent the following variants: 

 Red - Full flavored tobacco 

 Green - Mentholated cigarette 
 Blue - Lights version, featuring lower tar and nicotine content
 Orange - Ultra light version, with significantly lower tar and nicotine content
 White Green - Light Menthol flavor
 Black Green - Full flavored menthol tobacco flavor  

As of July 2022, Pall Mall is sold as a Canadian discount brand in Red (full-flavor) and Blue (light).

In the United Kingdom, Pall Mall cigarettes were sold as a mid-range brand and were regular Red, Blue and Menthol cigarettes until they later got replaced with Capsules.  
Due to the EU menthol ban that came into force on May 20, 2020, Pall Mall changed the names of their products sold in the UK as follows: 
1. Pall Mall Red Flow KS and SK (previously Pall Mall Red Capsule)?
2. Pall Mall Blue Flow KS and SK (previously Pall Mall Blue Capsule) 
3. Pall Mall Silver Capsule (discontinued) 
4. Pall Mall Green Capsule (discontinued) 
5. Pall Mall Shift (sold in 20s and 23 packs) (previously Pall Mall Double Capsule)

Logo

The Pall Mall logo has large Art Nouveau lettering spelling out "Pall Mall" on the top front of the red pack. On the face is a white coat of arms on the front and back of the package. Showing two regal lions pawing the sides and a knight's helmet on top. There is a banner underneath the shield that holds another Latin phrase, "In hoc signo vinces" or "By this sign shall you conquer". The Pall Mall slogan, "Wherever Particular People Congregate", appears beneath the coat of arms.

In 2007, R. J. Reynolds Tobacco Company changed the packaging color of Pall Mall Ultra Lights from light blue to orange to stop confusion between the Ultra Lights and the Lights. Both had been in blue colored packaging.

In 2009, R. J. Reynolds Tobacco Company changed the flavor descriptors of all the Pall Mall brand hard packs to color designations. The descriptor change occurred because the FDA banned product descriptors such as "Light," "Ultra Light" and "Mild" in 2010. Along with the change in descriptors, the rings and branding on the cigarettes have changed to match both the color of the box and the Pall Mall lettering on the filter for that particular descriptor. The soft packs are still sold with the traditional style packaging and design.

In 2015, the FDA required that two varieties of Pall Mall be removed from stores, Deep Set Recessed Filter (blue) and Deep Set Recessed Filter Menthol, as well as Camel Crush Bold and Vantage Tech 13.

Pronunciation 
Older smokers in the U.S. who heard the commercials often still use the older pronunciation.

Sponsorships
Pall Mall sponsored the radio shows Ripley's Believe It or Not in the 1940s and The Big Story in the 1940s and 1950s.

The brand was the sponsor of M Squad, a television program which ran on NBC during the late 1950s. Lee Marvin, the show's star, appeared on its commercials during the episodes. It was an alternating sponsor of MGM Parade in the 1955–56 season. Despite the ban on cigarette ads on TV that went into effect on January 2, 1971, Pall Mall ads from the show are seen on Turner Classic Movies intact.

Cultural references 
 Kurt Vonnegut, who was a Pall Mall smoker, mentioned the brand in several of his novels. Kurt Vonnegut once said that smoking was "a classy way to commit suicide". In the introduction to his book Welcome to the Monkey House: The Special Edition, Vonnegut said "My brand is Pall Mall. The authentic suicides ask for Pall Malls. The dilettantes ask for Pell Mells."
 In the 1989 novel The Dark Half by Stephen King, Thad Beaumont's parasitic twin George Stark smokes Pall Malls, which Thad had previously smoked before quitting.
 In the 2001 video game The Mystery of the Druids, the game's main character Detective Brent Halligan smokes Pall Malls, and keeps a carton in his office.

See also 
 Tobacco smoking

References

External links

 

R. J. Reynolds Tobacco Company brands
Cigarette brands
Products introduced in 1899
British American Tobacco brands